Dropping the Soap is an American comedy web series that parodies the soap opera genre, created by Paul Witten, Mandy Fabian and Kate Mines.  It goes behind-the-scenes of a struggling daytime soap opera called Collided Lives.

Premise
In the new era of television, daytime soap opera Collided Lives struggles to stay afloat. The cast and crew, including leading man Julian Draker (Paul Witten) and new executive producer Olivia Vanderstein (Jane Lynch), try to hold things together.

Development and production
Production was announced in March 2013 with Lisa Kudrow, Jane Lynch, Dan Bucatinsky, Don Roos, Damon Bethel and Joseph Gomes acting as executive producers. By the time the series premiered in 2017, only Lynch remained as executive producer joined by Paul Witten, Kate Mines, Mandy Fabian and Ellie Kanner. After initial attempts to get a brand involved, Witten and the others succeeded in finding independent financing of the 10 twelve-minute episodes on their own.

Reception
The series debuted on Dekkoo in March 2017. The series was also made available on streaming platforms Amazon Prime Instant Video, Roku, Google Play, WithLove and iTunes. Jane Lynch won the Primetime Emmy Award for Outstanding Actress in a Short Form Comedy or Drama Series.

References

External links
 Official website

2017 web series debuts
American comedy web series
American LGBT-related web series